The Bayamón Central University—or Universidad Central de Bayamón (UCB) in Spanish—is a private, Catholic university in Bayamón, Puerto Rico. Its predecessor began in 1961 by the Dominican Order as a community college of the Catholic University of Puerto Rico (today known as the Pontifical Catholic University of Puerto Rico). Universidad Católica de Bayamón was incorporated in 1964.

The university became autonomous on September 1, 1970, and is currently accredited by the Council of Higher Education of Puerto Rico, the Middle States Association of Colleges and Schools, and by the Congregation for Catholic Education.

In October 1982 a multi-use sports complex inaugurated and was dedicated in honor of Rafael Pont Flores and it bears his name.

In October 2019, US federal funds were earmarked for the university.

References

External links
 Official website

Universities and colleges in Puerto Rico
Liga Atletica Interuniversitaria de Puerto Rico
Catholic universities and colleges in Puerto Rico
Educational institutions established in 1964
1964 establishments in Puerto Rico